Sound of Red is an album by René Marie. It earned Marie a Grammy Award nomination for Best Jazz Vocal Album.

References

2016 albums
Vocal jazz albums